Turks in the former Soviet Union were a relatively small minority within the Soviet Union. However, their presence is considered important within Turkology due to the deportation of thousands of Turks from their home countries. Under the Ottoman Empire, Samtskhe-Javakheti was heavily Islamised producing a Turkish ethnicity within the southwestern region of Georgia. In November 1944, up to 120,000 of these Turks were deported to Central Asia under the rule of Joseph Stalin.

History 
Turks in the former Soviet Union have a long history beginning in the Ottoman Empire when the Turks began to migrate to the Ottoman territories which created Turkish communities in Georgia and Ukraine. However, large migration of Turks to other post-Soviet states was in 1944 when the Meskhetian Turks were suppressed by Joseph Stalin and deported to Central Asia. The Turkish community were originally native to the Georgian-Turkish border area and forcibly displaced to Central Asia on November 15, 1944. The majority of Turks settled in Uzbekistan, however, in 1989, anti-Meskhetian riots broke out due to their superior living standards and economic well-being in an area heavily struck by unemployment. Thus, over 90,000 Turks resettled from Uzbekistan to other parts of the Soviet Union. Some of the Turks relocated in and around Nagorno-Karabakh. However, when the Armenians took control of the area, they were once again forced to flee. Although some have returned to Georgia, a problem however has constantly been that Georgians and Armenians who resettled into the homes of the Turks have vowed to take up arms against any return movements. Moreover, many Georgians have advocated that the Meskhetian Turks should be sent to Turkey, 'where they belong'.

Ethnic cleansing 

Within the Soviet Union, ethnic cleansing of Turks during World War II took the form of mass deportations carried out by the Soviet secret police and the Red Army. The reason for the deportation was because the Soviet Union was preparing to launch a pressure campaign against Turkey. In June 1945 Vyacheslav Molotov, then Minister of Foreign Affairs, formally presented a demand to the Turkish Ambassador in Moscow for the surrender of three Anatolian provinces (Kars, Ardahan and Artvin). Moscow was also preparing to support Armenian claims to several other Anatolian provinces. Thus, war against Turkey seemed possible, and Joseph Stalin wanted to clear the strategic Turkish population (especially those situated in Meskheti) located near the Turkish-Georgian border which were likely to be hostile to Soviet intentions. The deportation is relatively poorly documented, but Soviet sources suggests that an estimated 115,000 Turks were deported mainly to Central Asia, most of which settled in Uzbekistan. 

In 1989, ethnic clashes between the Uzbeks and Turks occurred. According to official figures, 103 people died and over 1,000 were wounded. Moreover, 700 houses were destroyed and more than 60,000 Meskhetian Turks were driven out of Uzbekistan. The events of 1989 are considered by the Turks as their second deportation. Those that remained in Uzbekistan complained (in private due to the fear of repercussions) of ethnic discrimination.

Demographics 

Although the last Soviet census recorded a figure of 207,512 Turks, this may have not counted all ethnic Turks, because for many years, Turks were denied the right to register their ethnicity in legal documents. For example, in Kazakhstan only a third of them were recorded as Turks on their passports. The rest had been arbitrarily declared members of other ethnic groups.

Notable people
Ulus Baker
Hüseyin Özkan

See also 
Demographics of the Soviet Union
Human rights in the Soviet Union
Population transfer in the Soviet Union
Russification
Turks in Europe

References

Bibliography 
 

.
.

.
.
.
.
.
.
.
.

Demographics of the Soviet Union
Ethnic groups in the Soviet Union
Turkish diaspora
Forced migration in the Soviet Union
Political repression in the Soviet Union
Soviet Union–Turkey relations